Geoffrey Robert Wilson (2 January 1940 – 12 January 2022) was an Australian rules footballer who played with Hawthorn in the Victorian Football League (VFL). Wilson died on 12 January 2022, at the age of 82.

Notes

External links 

WAFL playing statistics

1940 births
2022 deaths
Australian rules footballers from Victoria (Australia)
Claremont Football Club players
Hawthorn Football Club players